Joss Fritz (c.1470–c.1525) was a German insurgent. Full name Joseph Fritz,  he was a serf from Untergrombach, Bruchsal.

In 1512, Fritz continued as a leader in a series of freedom oriented rebellions against local feudal and church rule started by Hans Boheim in 1476, 1493, 1501.  Fritz was "a soldier of commanding presence and great natural eloquence, used to battle and above all to patience.  He was one of those who had escaped being quartered.  His banner was blue silk with a white cross, and underneath the motto, "O Lord, help the righteous."  Fritz was the William Tell of his times.  No wonder his name is a favorite one among the Germans."  J. H. Ward.

Fritz was particularly active in the Upper Rhine area, organizing at least three major Bundschuh revolts, in 1502, 1512 and 1519. These revolts were all suppressed before they could take form, however, as he was repeatedly betrayed by fellow conspirators.

Notes

Year of death missing
Year of birth uncertain
16th-century German people
16th-century rebels